The House at 62 Daly Avenue in Park City, Utah, presumably located at 62 Daly Ave., was built around 1885.  It was listed on the National Register of Historic Places in 1984.

It is a frame "T/L cottage", which was expanded somewhat around 1889.

It may no longer exist.

References

		
National Register of Historic Places in Summit County, Utah
Houses completed in 1885
1885 establishments in Utah Territory